Bettincourt is a village of Wallonia and a district of the municipality of Waremme, located in the province of Liège, Belgium.

The village was a municipality of its own before the 1977 fusion of municipalities.

Its church is dedicated to Saint Lambert.

The Dutch name of the village, Bettenhoven, is the origin of the surname of the German composer Ludwig van Beethoven.

Guy Coëme was born here, a Francophone Belgian politician who served as Minister-President of Wallonia in 1988.

Former municipalities of Liège Province